The Enemy General is a 1960 American drama war film directed by George Sherman and starring Van Johnson.

The film was shot on location in Europe.

Plot
The setting is World War II. An Office of Strategic Services agent, working with the French Resistance, ambushes a Nazi convoy with a high-ranking general, who escapes. Later they take him from a Nazi prison and smuggle him to England.

Cast
 Van Johnson as Allan Lemaire
 Jean-Pierre Aumont as Lionel Durand
 Dany Carrel as Lisette
 John Van Dreelen as Gen. Bruger
 Françoise Prévost as Nicole 
 Hubert Noël as Claude
 Jacques Marin as Marceau
 Gérard Landry as Navarre
 Edward Fleming as Sgt. Allen
 Paul Bonifas as Mayor
 Paul Muller as Maj. Zughoff

Novelization
A novelization of the screenplay was issued by Monarch Books in May, 1960—about two months in advance of the film's release (as was often customary in the era). The by-line was given as "Dan Pepper & Max Gareth". Both names were pseudonyms. "Dan Pepper", also credited as co-screenwriter, was a joint pseudonym for Lou Morheim (who would become a noted screenwriter and producer under his own name) and American novelist Stuart James.

References

External links
 
 
 
 

1960 films
Columbia Pictures films
American World War II films
Films set in Germany
Films directed by George Sherman
Office of Strategic Services in fiction
1960s English-language films
1960s American films